Daily Planet was a promotional page appearing in DC Comics publications from 1976 to 1981. The Daily Planet contained previews of upcoming stories, as well as recurring features like "The Answer Man", where DC writer/editor Bob Rozakis would answer questions sent in by readers, and a comic strip by cartoonist Fred Hembeck which poked fun at DC characters. Edited by Rozakis, the Daily Planet was set in the format of a page from the fictional Metropolis newspaper where Clark Kent worked.

Publication history
The Daily Planet first appeared in House of Secrets #141, cover-dated May 1976. The volume numbers started at 76, to correspond with the debut year 1976. Each week a new issue of the Planet appeared in select issues of DC's lineup. As time went on, new material and features were added, including puzzles, crosswords, and trivia.

Beginning in 1980, the Daily Planet was rotated with its sister publication, the Feature Page, which often featured an expanded "Answer Man" column and "DC Profiles" of company creators. In 1981, the Planet was moved exclusively to DC Dollar Comics The Superman Family and World's Finest Comics. With only seven issues produced in 1981, the Daily Planet feature was discontinued after the December 1981 issue (DC cover date March 1982). The "Direct Currents" section was continued sporadically on some comics' letters pages.

212 editions of the Daily Planet were produced from 1976 to 1981.

Successors
In 1983, DC instituted a monthly column much more in the vein of Marvel's "Bullpen Bulletins". Titled "Meanwhile...", it was written by DC Executive Editor Dick Giordano for most of its history, which ran into the early 1990s. Unlike "Bullpen Bulletins", which was characterized by an ironic, over-hyped tone, Giordano's columns "were written in a relatively sober, absolutely friendly voice, like a friend of your father's you particularly liked and didn't mind sitting down to listen to". Giordano closed each "Meanwhile..." column with the characteristic words, "Thank you and good afternoon".

As the "Meanwhile..." column started to peter out, it was succeeded by a similar page called "DCI with Johnny DC". The Johnny DC column featured miscellaneous DC news items, often spotlighting certain books or creators, and also included a partial checklist of current DC titles.

Recurring features
 The Answer Man — Rozakis answering reader-submitted questions ranging from basic trivia to obscure facts about DC characters.
 What It's Worth? — Short-lived "sub-feature" created in response to frequent inquiries about the value of back issues.
 Hembeck — Three-panel strip that ran from 1978 until the Daily Planet's demise in 1981.
 Direct Currents — Checklist of DC comics on sale that week.

Quotes
Writer Kurt Busiek:

See also
 The Amazing World of DC Comics
 DC Releases
 Johnny DC
 "Bullpen Bulletins"
 Comic book letter column

References

External links
 Daily Planet pages archive — Daily Planet scans
 The Hembeck Files — Digitally recolored archive of Hembeck's Daily Planet strips
 Voiles, Mike. Daily Planet Remembered". Mike's Amazing World of DC Comics.

DC Comics
House organs